Benin competed at the 1992 Summer Olympics in Barcelona, Spain. Six competitors, four men and two women, took part in six events in two sports.

Competitors
The following is the list of number of competitors in the Games.

Athletics 

Men

Women

Field events

Cycling

Two male cyclists represented Benin in 1992.

Road

References

External links
Official Olympic Reports

Nations at the 1992 Summer Olympics
1992
Olympics